Springfield is a city in Lane County, Oregon, United States. Located in the Southern Willamette Valley, it is within the Eugene-Springfield Metropolitan Statistical Area. Separated from Eugene to the west, mainly by Interstate 5, Springfield is the second-most populous city in the metropolitan area after Eugene. As of the 2020 census, the city has a total population of 61,851.

The Briggs family first settled the Springfield area, arriving in 1848. The community was incorporated as a city in 1885. The city was named after a natural spring located in a field or prairie within the current city boundaries. For the majority of the 20th century, the economy of Springfield was largely dependent on the Oregon timber industry; since the 1990s, however, the economy has diversified, with PeaceHealth now the largest employer in the city. Public education in the city is provided by the Springfield School District.

History

The first inhabitants to the area were the Kalapuya people. Also sometimes written as Calapooia or Calapooya, the people maintained the valley and their main food sources by controlled burning.

Springfield was settled when Elias and Mary Briggs and their family arrived in 1848. They were among the first party to travel to the region via the "Southern Route" by Klamath Lake, over the Cascades, into the Rogue Valley, then north to the Willamette Valley. Elias Briggs along with William Stevens ran a ferry on the nearby Willamette River.

According to donation land claim records, Stevens was the first settler to stake a claim in the Springfield locale, arriving in October 1847. He commenced building a house with his three oldest sons, and when the house was completed in December, the rest of his family joined him on Christmas Day that year.

Another early arrival in the Springfield vicinity was Captain Felix Scott, Sr. who settled between the McKenzie and Willamette rivers in 1847.

In 1854 Springfield School District No. 19 was formed. A small schoolhouse was built near the corner of south 7th and B streets; it served the community until the 1880s. Miss Agnes Stewart, a young woman from Pennsylvania, was the first teacher. She had arrived in Springfield via the Lost Wagon Train of 1853.

In May 1992 the municipality became the first in the United States to include anti-gay legislation in its city charter after a campaign by the Oregon Citizens Alliance. However, the state legislature later passed a law that prevented anti-gay ordinances from being enforced.

Economy

For years, the economy of Springfield hinged on the timber industry, with the largest employer being Weyerhaeuser Company. Weyerhaeuser opened its Springfield complex in 1949, and after years of aggressive logging was forced to downsize as old growth lumber became less available. In the 1990s, the Weyerhaeuser sawmill and veneer (plywood) plants closed, and the paper plant was downsized. Springfield has now developed a more diversified economy.

Ken Kesey's brother Chuck, and Chuck's wife Sue, started the Springfield Creamery in 1960. The business survives today based partly on sales of their flagship product, Nancy's Yogurt, developed from recipes of Nancy Hamren. In the 1970s, the creamery avoided bankruptcy with the help of the rock band Grateful Dead, who over time held a series of 10 benefit concerts on behalf of the creamery. The documentary film Sunshine Daydream was shot at the first performance August 27, 1972.

The city of Springfield is surrounded by filbert (hazelnut) orchards. The production has declined over time as fields have been developed into housing. The city used to be sponsor an annual Filbert Festival in early August as a general summer celebration, featuring music, food, and family fun; it was canceled in 2007 due to withdrawal of a key sponsor, and the future for the festival is uncertain. Filbert harvesting occurs in October. 98% of American filbert production is harvested in the Willamette Valley.

Healthcare
Springfield is home to two hospitals, McKenzie-Willamette Medical Center and PeaceHealth's Sacred Heart Medical Center at RiverBend.

Largest employers
According to the City's 2018 Comprehensive Annual Financial Report, the largest employers in the city are:

Government

Springfield has a council–manager form of government. The current mayor of Springfield is Sean VanGordon, and the city manager is Nancy Newton. The city council comprises members from 6 wards. The current council members are:
Ward 1: Damien Pitts 
Ward 2: Steve Moe
Ward 3: Kori Rodley
Ward 4: Leonard Stoehr
Ward 5: Marilee Woodrow
Ward 6: Joe Pishioneri (Council President)

Public safety
The Springfield Police Department and Eugene Springfield Fire are the city's public safety agencies. The Springfield police department is currently under investigation due to allegations of sexual misconduct made by a female former officer.

Geography

The McKenzie River forms the northern city limits.

Neighborhoods
Springfield does not have any official neighborhood designations. Unofficial neighborhood areas include:
Gateway
Glenwood
North Springfield
Thurston
Washburne Historic District, listed on the National Register of Historic Places
Meadow Park
Kelly Butte
West Kelly Butte

Demographics

2010 census
As of the census of 2010, there were 59,403 people, 23,665 households, and 14,737 families residing in the city. The racial makeup of the city was 85.9% White, 1.1% African American, 1.4% Native American, 1.3% Asian, 0.3% Pacific Islander, 5.2% from other races, and 4.8% from two or more races. Hispanic or Latino of any race were 12.1% of the population.

There were 23,665 households, of which 33.2% had children under the age of 18 living with them, 40.9% were married couples living together, 15.2% had a female householder with no husband present, 6.2% had a male householder with no wife present, and 37.7% were non-families. 27.9% of all households were made up of individuals, and 9.2% had someone living alone who was 65 years of age or older. The average household size was 2.49 and the average family size was 3.00.

The median age in the city was 34.5 years. 24.3% of residents were under the age of 18; 10.1% were between the ages of 18 and 24; 29% were from 25 to 44; 25% were from 45 to 64; and 11.6% were 65 years of age or older. The gender makeup of the city was 49.0% male and 51.0% female.

Arts and culture
Author Ken Kesey moved to Springfield when he was young and graduated from Springfield High School before moving on to the nearby University of Oregon. After some years of wandering (described in The Electric Kool-Aid Acid Test by Tom Wolfe), Kesey bought a farm in nearby Pleasant Hill and remained a prominent local celebrity until his death in 2001.

Library
The Springfield Public Library is located within city hall. The city hall itself is home to a seal of the city of Springfield, created out of unusual items from the city's sewer system. The seal and its creator, Russell Ziolkowski, were featured on The Tonight Show and On the Road with Charles Kuralt.

Cultural venues
The Richard E. Wildish Community Theater on Main Street in downtown Springfield, a complete renovation of the historic McKenzie Theater, opened in December 2006. The theater seats 284 people and is designed to host music concerts and recitals, dance, drama, festivals and small musicals. The Springfield Renaissance Development Corporation spearheaded the six-year renovation project, completed at a cost of $3.1 million.

Education
There are 15 elementary, 4 middle, and 4 high schools in the Springfield School District, making it one of the largest in the state. The largest public high schools, by enrollment, are Thurston High School and Springfield High School. Pioneer Pacific College also has a campus in the Gateway area of Springfield.

In popular culture

The Simpsons

The city took third in the voting to choose one of the sixteen possible Springfields in the U.S. to host the premiere of The Simpsons Movie. The show's creator, Oregon resident Matt Groening, sent a plaque to the city of Springfield that stated, in part "Yo to Springfield, Oregon – the real Springfield." In April 2012, Groening confirmed to Smithsonian magazine that he named the fictional Springfield after Springfield, Oregon. He also confirmed that he intentionally left it a secret to allow people the enjoyment of assuming it was based on their own Springfield.

Notable people
Sheila Bleck, IFBB professional bodybuilder
John Charles Bolsinger, serial killer
Colby Covington, Mixed Martial Arts Fighter
Peter DeFazio, U.S. Representative for Oregon's 4th congressional district
Bill Dellinger, Olympic athlete and former University of Oregon track coach
Diane Downs, child murderer arrested and jailed in Springfield
Clint Eastwood, actor, log bronc operator for Weyerhaeuser in Springfield
Ken Kesey, author
Matt Groening, Creator of The Simpsons
Kip Kinkel, perpetrator of the Thurston High School shooting
Eric Millegan, Broadway and television actor
Mickey Newbury, American songwriter, recording artist, member Nashville Songwriters Hall of Fame *Steve Reeves, Actor and body builder
Travis Smith, major league baseball player
Dan Straily (born 1988), starting pitcher in the Philadelphia Phillies organization
Robert W. Straub, Oregon governor
Theodore Sturgeon, science fiction author
Shoshana R. Ungerleider, physician and film producer
Mercedes Russell, Professional Basketball Player WNBA
Dave Wolverton, novelist and writer

Climate
This region experiences hot and dry summers, with no average monthly temperatures above . According to the Köppen Climate Classification system, Springfield has a warm-summer Mediterranean climate, abbreviated "Csb" on climate maps.

See also 
Hayden Bridge (Springfield, Oregon)—a historic bridge in the city.

References

Further reading
Anderson, Wendell (2002). Eugene-Springfield: a contemporary portrait. (1st ed.). Montgomery, AL: Community Communications. . .
Dennis, Michelle L. (1999). Springfield, Oregon, 1848-1955: historic context statement . (Rev. ed.). Springfield Development Services Dept.

Clarke, David W (1983). The Springfield Millrace and early mills. Springfield Historical Commission.
Williams, Jerold (1983). Springfield: a history. Springfield, OR: Springfield Public Schools, District 19 Communications Dept.

External links

City of Springfield official website
Springfield Chamber of Commerce
Entry for Springfield in the Oregon Blue Book
Springfield Celebrates 125 Years
Springfield HISTORIC CONTEXT STATEMENT
Springfield Mill Race Oral History Project
Springfield Museum Timeline

 
Cities in Oregon
Populated places established in 1848
Cities in Lane County, Oregon
1848 establishments in Oregon Territory
Populated places on the Willamette River
The Simpsons